Asiamericana (AY-zha-MER-i-KAHN-a – (Greek: Asia meaning Asia and New Latin Americas meaning Americas) is a dubious dinosaur genus known only from isolated teeth. It was named to recognize the occurrence of similar fossil teeth in Central Asia and North America. These regions once formed a connected land mass, during the Cretaceous period and were referred to as Asiamerica.

The teeth were discovered by L. A. Nesov in 1995. The findings were based on three teeth found in the central Kyzylkum desert, Uzbekistan, in deposits of the Bissekty Formation, dated to the mid-late Turonian age of the Late Cretaceous, about 90 million years ago. They are comparable to other teeth found in Kazakhstan and North America, which have been illustrated but not formally described. The type species is A. asiatica.

The teeth themselves are straight, lack a constriction at the base, and lack serrations.

Classification
In his initial description of the unusual teeth, Nesov speculated that they may belong to either saurodont fish or to spinosaurid dinosaurs. He later changed his opinion, deciding that they definitely represented theropod remains, and this opinion was followed by most later researchers who excluded them from reviews of spinosaurid teeth for this reason.

However, in 2013 a study assumed that the teeth were identical to those of the possibly dromaeosaurid Richardoestesia isosceles, and renamed the species into Richardoestesia asiatica. A subsequent study confirmed this in 2019.

References

Prehistoric coelurosaurs
Late Cretaceous dinosaurs of Asia
Fossil taxa described in 1995